Chiesa di Santa Maria may refer to:
 Chiesa di Santa Maria di Costantinopoli
 Chiesa di Santa Maria del Soccorso
 Chiesa di Santa Maria a Cetrella